Stephen Jones (born 29 April 1993) is a New Zealand rower. He was educated, and commenced rowing, at St Peter's College, Auckland. He came fourth at the 2015 World Rowing Championships with the men's eight, qualifying the boat for the 2016 Olympics. He came sixth with his team at the eight competition in Rio de Janeiro.

References

Living people
1993 births
New Zealand male rowers
Olympic rowers of New Zealand
Rowers at the 2016 Summer Olympics
People educated at St Peter's College, Auckland
Rowers at the 2020 Summer Olympics